FK Rečica (Macedonian and Serbian Cyrillic: ФК Речица) is a football club of the Serbian community based in the village of Rečica near Kumanovo, North Macedonia. They are currently competing in the Macedonian Third League (North Division).

History
The club was founded in 1950.

References

External links
Club info at MacedonianFootball 
Football Federation of Macedonia 

Rečica
Association football clubs established in 1950
1950 establishments in the Socialist Republic of Macedonia
FK